Henry T. Eubanks (1853 - 1913) was a waiter and barber proprietor who served as a state legislator in Cleveland, Ohio. He served in the Ohio House of Representatives. He was a Republican and served two non-consecutive terms from 1904 to 1905 and 1909 to 1910.

Eubanks was born in Stanford, Kentucky. He promoted anti-lynching legislation.

Eubanks (1853 - 1913) was a waiter, barbershop proprietor, and state legislator. He lived in Cleveland, Ohio. He was a Republican

He worked as a waiter in Louisville, Kentucky. He had a barbershop in Cleveland.
555 He declined to speak at one meeting to avoid ana argument.

See also
African-American officeholders during and following the Reconstruction era

References

1853 births
20th-century American politicians
Year of death missing
Ohio Republicans
People from Stanford, Kentucky
African-American state legislators in Ohio
Barbers